Cartan's theorem may refer to several mathematical results by Élie Cartan:

Closed-subgroup theorem, 1930, that any closed subgroup of a Lie group is a Lie subgroup
Theorem of the highest weight, that the irreducible representations of Lie algebras or Lie groups are classified by their highest weights
Lie's third theorem, an equivalence between Lie algebras and simply-connected Lie groups

See also
 Cartan's theorems A and B, c.1931 results by Henri Cartan concerning a coherent sheaf on a Stein manifold
 Cartan's lemma, several results by Élie or Henri Cartan
 Cartan–Dieudonné theorem, a result on orthogonal transformations and reflections

Lie groups
Theorems in abstract algebra